Jon Morrison is a Scottish actor who has appeared in many plays, films and television series since the early 1970s, including The Bill, Bergerac, Taggart and Vera.

His best-known parts have been in the Peter McDougall plays Just Another Saturday (1975), about sectarianism in Glasgow, and The Elephants' Graveyard (1976), both with Billy Connolly and both part of BBC's Play for Today series. He also featured in Gary Oldman's Nil by Mouth (1997).

Morrison has portrayed DC Kenny Lockhart on the ITV detective series Vera, from the start of the programme in 2011 through series 12 in 2023.

References

External links

Scottish male stage actors
Scottish male film actors
Scottish male television actors
Living people
Year of birth missing (living people)